Duninia is a genus of Asian tree trunk spiders that was first described by Yuri M. Marusik & Victor R. Fet in 2009.

Species
 it contains four species:
Duninia baehrae Marusik & Fet, 2009 (type) – Turkmenistan, Iran
Duninia darvishi Mirshamsi & Marusik, 2013 – Iran
Duninia grodnitskyi Zamani & Marusik, 2018 – Iran
Duninia rheimsae Marusik & Fet, 2009 – Iran

References

Araneomorphae genera
Hersiliidae
Spiders of Asia